This list of notable Florida International University alumni includes alumni, faculty, and presidents of Florida International University in Miami, Florida, which includes 26 colleges and schools.

Alumni
With more than 150,500 alumni around the world, the Florida International University Golden Panthers constitute one of the fastest-growing university alumni groups in the state of Florida. FIU graduates more than 8,000 students a year and confers more than half of all degrees awarded by universities in South Florida.

Sports

Baseball

Basketball

Equestrian

Football

Soccer

Track & Field

Other sports
 David Avellan, electrical engineering graduate, mixed martial artist
Steve Meister (born 1958), tennis player

Authors and entertainers

Authors, actors, television, musicians

Entertainment

Law and politics

House of Representatives, U.S. Court Judges

State & local politics

Foreign governments

Education

Science and space

Faculty

Irtishad Ahmad, professor and chairperson of Florida International University Department of Construction Management and editor in chief of the Journal of Management in Engineering ASCE
Thomas E. Baker, Professor of Constitutional Law in the College of Law
Lynne Barrett, Professor of English and founder of Gulf Stream Magazine
Rita Buck-Crockett, Assistant Athletic Director and head volleyball and beach volleyball coach
William Darrow, Professor of Public Health
John Dufresne, professor of creative writing, editor of Gulf Stream Magazine, author
Elizabeth Price Foley, Professor of Law in the College of Law
Edgar Fuller, professor of mathematics and statistics
Orlando Jacinto García, Professor of Music and director of the Composition Program for the School of Music
Steven Heine, Professor of Religion and History; Director of the Institute for Asian Studies
Mark Hetzler, Professor of Music and Orchestra
Sundaraja Sitharama Iyengar, Professor of Computer Science in the College of Engineering and Computing
Abraham Lavender, Professor of Sociology; president of the Society for Crypto-Judaic Studies
Stephen Leatherman, director of the FIU Coastal Research Lab, nicknamed "Dr. Beach" for his annual ratings of American beaches (issued every Memorial Day weekend)
Bruce Nissen, professor of labor studies and director of research at the Center for Labor Research and Studies and director of the FIU Research Institute on Social and Economic Policy
Ronni Reis, tennis coach
Stewart Robertson, professor of orchestral studies and conductor of the FIU Symphony Orchestra

University presidents

References

Florida International University